Yurisandy Hernández (born February 15, 1990) is a Cuban Greco-Roman wrestler. He competed in the men's Greco-Roman 75 kg event at the 2016 Summer Olympics, in which he was eliminated in the round of 16 by Andy Bisek.

References

External links
 

1990 births
Living people
Cuban male sport wrestlers
Olympic wrestlers of Cuba
Wrestlers at the 2016 Summer Olympics
Place of birth missing (living people)